The Avatici (Gaulish: *Auaticoi) were a Gallic tribe dwelling near the Étang de Berre, between the mouth of the Rhône river and Massilia (modern Marseille), during the Roman period.

Name 
They are mentioned as Au̓atilō͂n (Αὐατιλῶν; var. Αὐατικῶν) by Ptolemy (2nd c. AD), and an oppidum Maritima Avaticorum is documented by Pliny (1st c. AD) and Pomponius Mela (mid-1st c. AD).

Geography

Territory 
The Avatici dwelled near the Étang de Berre, southwest of the Saluvii, and possibly northwest of the Tricores. Their territory stretched from the eastern part of the mouth of the Rhône river to the west of Massilia, and from the Mediterranean Sea to the Crau in the north. According to historian Guy Barruol, they were part of the Saluvian confederation.

Settlements 
The location of the settlement is not precisely indicated by the sources, but most scholars place it in modern Martigues, possibly at the site of Tholon, on the coast of the Étang de Berre. Ptolemy, and later the Ravenna Cosmography, calls it a Colonia, but this is likely an error since both Mela and Pliny (who used sources from the Augustan period) refer to the settlement as an oppidum in the 1st century AD. The lands situated around the Étang de Berre were probably given to Arelate (Arles) by the Romans when their subjugated Massalia in 49 BC.

Another oppidum was located at Mastromela or Mastramélē (Μαστραμέλη).

See also 
Gaul
List of peoples of Gaul
List of Celtic tribes

References

Primary sources

Bibliography 

 
Gauls
Tribes of pre-Roman Gaul
Historical Celtic peoples